Cyril Lincoln Sibusiso Nyembezi (1919–2000) was a South African writer known as a Zulu novelist, poet, scholar, teacher and editor. Inkinsela yase Mgungundlovu was made into a television series because of the popularity of the novel.

Bibliography 

Novels 
Mntanami! Mntanami! Lincroft books (first printing in 1950 and later entitled Ushicilelo lwesithathu in third printing, 1965)
Ubudoda abukhulelwa (1953) Shuter and Shooter
Inkinsela yase Mgungundlovu (1961) Shuter and Shooter

Poetry 
Imisebe yelanga (1963) Afrikaanse Pers Boekhandel
Amahlunga aluhlaza (1963) Shuter and Shooter

Folklore 
Zulu Proverbs Johannesburg: University of the Witwatersrand
Izibongo zamakhosi Pietermaritzburg: Shuter and Shooter.(1958)
Inqolobane yesizwe (1966) (with Otty Ezrom Nxumalo). Pietermaritzburg: Shuter and Shooter

Translation 
Cry, The Beloved Country, by Alan Paton, translated into Zulu as Lafa elihle kakhulu (1958), Pietermaritzburg: Shuter and Shooter

Zulu language studies 
Uhlelo lwesiZulu (1956) Pietermaritzburg: Shuter and Shooter
Learn Zulu (1958) Pietermaritzburg: Shuter and Shooter
Compact Zulu Dictionary. London: Dent.(Isizulu)

References

South African male novelists
Zulu people
1919 births
2000 deaths
20th-century South African poets
20th-century South African novelists
South African male poets
20th-century South African male writers